Coleophora hungariae is a moth of the family Coleophoridae. It is found in Austria, Bulgaria, Hungary, Romania, Slovakia and southern Russia.

Adults emerge in mid-July and are on wing to the end of August.

The larvae feed on Camphorosma species, including Camphorosma annua. They feed from within a case.

Subspecies
Coleophora hungariae hungariae (Austria, Bulgaria, Hungary, Romania, Slovakia)
Coleophora hungariae eruslani Anikin, 2005 (southern Russia)

References

hungariae
Moths described in 1955
Moths of Europe